Sajna is a river of northeastern Poland, a tributary of the Guber in Sątoczno.

Rivers of Poland
Rivers of Warmian-Masurian Voivodeship